Rhys van Nek (born 17 July 1999) is an Australian rugby union player who plays for the  in Super Rugby. His playing position is prop. He was named in the Rebels squad for the 2021 Super Rugby AU season. He previously represented  in the 2019 National Rugby Championship.

Super Rugby statistics

Reference list

External links
Rugby.com.au profile
itsrugby.co.uk profile

1999 births
Australian rugby union players
Living people
Rugby union props
Melbourne Rebels players
Brisbane City (rugby union) players
ACT Brumbies players